The Atlas of North American English: Phonetics, Phonology and Sound Change (abbreviated ANAE; formerly, the Phonological Atlas of North America) is an overview of the pronunciation patterns (accents) in all the major regional dialects of the English language spoken in urban areas of the United States and Canada. It is the result of a large-scale survey by linguists William Labov, Sharon Ash, and Charles Boberg. Speech data was collected, mainly during the 1990s, by means of telephone interviews with individuals in metropolitan areas in all regions of the U.S. and Canada. Using acoustic analysis of speech from these interviews, ANAE traces sound changes in progress in North American English, and defines boundaries between dialect regions based on the different sound changes taking place in them.

The Atlas of North American English received the Leonard Bloomfield Book Award at the 2008 meeting of the Linguistic Society of America.

Findings
The Atlas defines several major dialect regions on the basis of distinctive phonological patterns and sound changes taking place in them—often chain shifts among the vowel phonemes. Major regions include:
 The North, characterized by the Northern Cities Vowel Shift
 Canada, characterized by the Canadian Vowel Shift
 Several dialects in New England, characterized by different combinations of the cot-caught merger and non-rhoticity
 New York City, characterized by non-rhoticity and a complex pattern of æ-tensing
 The Midland, characterized by the fronting of back vowels without the monophthongization of 
 The West, characterized by cot-caught merger and the absence of the distinctive features of the adjacent regions

On the basis of changes such as the Northern Cities Vowel Shift and the Canadian Shift, the Atlas concludes that regions are becoming more dissimilar to each other, and thus the dialect diversity of North America is increasing.

Notation
ANAE employs a "binary" phonemic notation system designed to be maximally abstract and economical so that it can be used to describe chain shifts with ease. The following tables provide a comparison between ANAE's notation and Wikipedia's diaphonemic transcription system.

See also 
North American English regional phonology
Dialectology

Notes

References

Bibliography

Linguistic atlases
North American English
Phonology
Leonard Bloomfield Book Award books